Pol sambol, or thenkai sambal, is a traditional Sri Lankan dish made from coconut, mostly used as an accompaniment with rice, string hoppers, hoppers and curries.  It is a coconut relish, consisting of freshly grated coconut, shallots, dried whole chilies (or chili powder), lime juice, salt and Maldive fish.

Ingredients
 Coconut
 Shallots
 Ground dry red chillies
 Salt
 Lime
 Pepper (optional)
 Maldive fish
 Garlic (optional)
 Tomato (optional)

Preparation
The traditional method for preparing pol sambol is to grind the freshly grated coconut, shallot, chillies and maldive fish (umbalakaḍa - a smoked and cured tuna, that is sold in chips or flakes) on a rectangular block of granite with a granite rolling-pin, known as a miris gala. If fresh coconut is unavailable then moistened desiccated coconut can be used as an alternative. Apply the juice of a freshly squeezed lime (or lemon) through the mixture, add salt if needed and serve as a side dish. A variation can be made by sautéing the pol sambol in mustard seeds, curry leaves and sliced onion, which is called Badapu Pol Sambol (sautéed pol sambol).

See also
 Cuisine of Sri Lanka
 Thenga chammanthi

References

Sri Lankan cuisine
Foods containing coconut